Singeumho Station is a station on Seoul Subway Line 5, Seoul, South Korea. Prior to its opening, it was originally planned to be called Musumak Station (무수막역). Because of the relatively high altitude of this neighborhood, the platform is located eight floors below ground level.

Station layout

References 

Metro stations in Seongdong District
Railway stations opened in 1996
Seoul Metropolitan Subway stations